Sincerus may refer to:

The Latin word for sincere or:

People
 Sincerus, Roman Catholic Bishopric of Amelia in the fifth century

Pseudonyms
 Samuel Adams (1722-1803) American statesman
 Elias Schwarzfeld (1855–1915), Moldavian and later Romanian Jewish historian, essayist, novelist and newspaperman who wrote as Edmond Sincerus
 Karl-August von Reisach (1800–1869), German Catholic theologian and Cardinal who wrote under Augusts Sincerus
 Sigmund Richter, a probable progenitor of the Order of the Golden and Rosy Cross who used the name Sincerus Renatus
 Peter Joseph Elvenich (1796–1886), German Catholic theologian and philosopher who wrote under Sincerus Pacificus
 Georg Ludwig Oeder, theologian and father of Georg Christian Oeder, who used the pseudonym Sincerus Pistophilus

Scientific names
 Tropidozineus sincerus, a species of beetle
 Adoretus  sincerus, a species of beetle